Zarate is a census-designated place (CDP) in Starr County, Texas, United States. This was a new CDP for the 2010 census with a population of 59.

Geography
Zarate is located at  (26.319936, -98.636931).

Education
It is in the Rio Grande City Grulla Independent School District (formerly Rio Grande City Consolidated Independent School District)

References

Census-designated places in Starr County, Texas
Census-designated places in Texas